Ronald Lee Knecht (born May 5, 1949) is an American attorney, businessman and politician. He is a member of the Republican Party.

Knecht ran for State Controller of Nevada in the 2014 election and defeated Democrat Andrew Martin. He lost re-election in 2018 to Democrat Catherine Byrne. He was the only Republican to lose re-election on a statewide office.

Electoral history

References

External links
 
 

1949 births
Living people
21st-century American politicians
Nevada lawyers
Nevada Republicans
Politicians from Carson City, Nevada
Politicians from Reno, Nevada
Politicians from San Francisco
Stanford University School of Engineering alumni
State Controllers of Nevada
University of Illinois Urbana-Champaign alumni
University of San Francisco School of Law alumni